Hymenocallis multiflora is a bulb-forming herb in the family Amaryllidaceae and native to Peru. Each individual has an umbel with several small, white flowers.

References

multiflora
Flora of Peru
Plants described in 1946